David Serrano may refer to:
 David Serrano (footballer)
 David Serrano (badminton)
 David Serrano (filmmaker)